Jonas Vandermarliere (born 7 March 1986 in Poperinge) is a Belgian footballer, who currently plays for Sassport Boezinge.

Career
He started his football career in his home town of Poperinge with K.F.C. Poperinge but from his tenth year on he played for R.S.C. Anderlecht. After spending 10 years at the Anderlecht youth team, Zulte-Waregem signed him to let him play in the first team. He is most known for scoring the all important away goal in the 94th minute against FC Lokomotiv Moscow in the UEFA Cup 2006-07.

References

External links
 Jonas Vandermarliere at Footballdatabase

1986 births
Living people
Belgian footballers
R.S.C. Anderlecht players
S.V. Zulte Waregem players
Royale Union Saint-Gilloise players
R.W.D.M. Brussels F.C. players
Belgian Pro League players
Challenger Pro League players
K.S.K. Heist players
Association football midfielders
Sportkring Sint-Niklaas players
People from Poperinge
Footballers from West Flanders